The North Point Lighthouse Museum is a lighthouse built in 1888 in Lake Park on the East Side of Milwaukee in Milwaukee County, Wisconsin, United States to mark the entrance to the Milwaukee River. The lighthouse was added to the National Register of Historic Places in 1984. It was also added to the Library of Congress Historic American Buildings Survey as survey HABS WI-358.

History
The first lighthouse on this bluff was built in 1855, a structure of Cream City brick with a cast iron lantern room, sited high to make it visible out on Lake Michigan. In the late 1880s it was jeopardized by erosion of the bluff and plans were made to replace it.

In 1888 a 40-foot cast-iron lighthouse tower was built 100 feet in from the edge of the bluff, and the Queen Anne-style light keeper's quarters was built. The original 1855 lantern room was used on the new 1888 tower. Today it is the only lighthouse in the country built of 3 lighthouses. 1855,1888,1912.

The first 1888 lantern burned mineral oil. It was converted to coal gas in 1912 and electrified in 1929. The Coast Guard  decommissioned the lighthouse in 1994. In 2003 Milwaukee County leased the lighthouse and keepers quarters to the North Point Lighthouse Friends and they began restoration of the tower and keepers quarters. A $984,000 grant was used to restore the light station and it re-opened to the public as a maritime museum in 2007.

See also
 Lighthouses in the United States
 Parks of Milwaukee

References

Further reading

 Havighurst, Walter (1943) The Long Ships Passing: The Story of the Great Lakes, Macmillan Publishers.
 Oleszewski, Wes, Great Lakes Lighthouses, American and Canadian: A Comprehensive Directory/Guide to Great Lakes Lighthouses, (Gwinn, Michigan: Avery Color Studios, Inc., 1998) .
 
 Sapulski, Wayne S., (2001) Lighthouses of Lake Michigan: Past and Present (Paperback) (Fowlerville: Wilderness Adventure Books) ; .
 Wright, Larry and Wright, Patricia, Great Lakes Lighthouses Encyclopedia Hardback (Erin: Boston Mills Press, 2006) .

External links

North Point Lighthouse Friends, Inc.
Seeing the light
Lighthouse friends article
NPS Inventory of Historic Light Stations - Wisconsin
Library of Congress Historic American Buildings Survey Survey number HABS WI-358
 North Point Light.

Lighthouses completed in 1888
Houses completed in 1888
Buildings and structures in Milwaukee
Lighthouses on the National Register of Historic Places in Wisconsin
Tourist attractions in Milwaukee
National Register of Historic Places in Milwaukee